Chiaphua Components Group is a supplier of electric motors, actuator systems, transaxles and controls, based in China.

History

The history of Chiaphua dates back to the acquisition of Wah Ming Electric Limited in 1978 by Chiaphua Industries.

In 1983, Wah Ming was merged into Eastern Time Limited, a subsidiary of Chiaphua Industries, as a motor division to allow for diversification into compatible technologies.

In 1987, the motor division of ETL was restructured as Chiaphua Components Limited (CCL), a new subsidiary of Chiaphua Industries. A technical tie-up was established in 1989 with Matoba Electric Manufacturing Co. Ltd. in Japan to further enhance its manufacturing know-how.

In 1992, CCL was spun off as an independent company from Chiaphua Industries. With its policy of constant upgrading of product range, a subsidiary, CCL Industrial Motor Ltd. was established in 1994 to facilitate the expansion into industrial applications.

In 2001, CCG pushes forward the expansion of its position in the motor markets of the United States, Europe and Asia.

In 2003, a new factory was opened at Shajing, China with an expansion of production capacity to millions of motors per month.

In 2005, CCG established Chiaphua Components Automotive Limited (CCAL) and developed a series of PMDC motors for automotive markets.

In 2007, a new R&D centre was established at Nanshan, Shenzhen.

In 2008, a new business unit formed – Branded Product Division.  CCG established Homelektro Limited and Nortus International Limited to create its own brand for providing ways to help with food waste and window treatment markets.

In 2015, New Fengcheng plant to produce industrial motors/drivers and contract manufacturing products.

Business segments

The company consists of three groups:

Chiaphua Components Limited (CCL) is a motor supplier for home appliance, floor care & HVAC, healthcare & mobility products, industrial products. Chiaphua Components Automotive Limited (CCAL) is mainly focus on supporting automotive applications such as fuel pumps, window lifts, wipers, car roofs etc.
 CCL Industrial Motor Limited (CIM), a subsidiary of Chiaphua Components Limited (CCL), is a contract manufacturer with focus on the motion-related industry.
 Branded Product Division (BPD) is mainly focused on branding and marketing new products using its own brands.

Hong Kong brands
Manufacturing companies of Hong Kong